Chestnut Hill is a historic home located at Orange, Orange County, Virginia. It was built about 1860, and is a two-story, frame dwelling in a combination of the Italianate and Greek Revival styles. A Second Empire style mansard roof was added in 1891. The front facade features a central, one-story, one-bay porch with a balustraded deck above and balustraded decks with the same scroll-sawn balusters across the front.  The historic floor plan is a double-pile center-passage plan with two interior chimneys serving four fireplaces on each floor. The house was moved to a new location, 150 feet away from its original site, when threatened with demolition in 2003.  Also on the property is a small, one-story, single-bay, 19th-century contributing shed.

It was listed on the National Register of Historic Places in 2009.

References

Houses on the National Register of Historic Places in Virginia
Houses completed in 1860
Italianate architecture in Virginia
Greek Revival houses in Virginia
Second Empire architecture in Virginia
Houses in Orange County, Virginia
National Register of Historic Places in Orange County, Virginia